Castles in the Air (Italian: Castelli in aria) is a 1939 Italian "white-telephones" comedy film directed by Augusto Genina and starring Lilian Harvey, Vittorio De Sica and Otto Treßler. It was made at Cinecittà in Rome, as part of a co-production with Germany. A separate German-language version was also released.

Synopsis
A wardrobe mistress at a Vienna theatre wins a competition, receiving as her prize a luxury tour round Italy. On the train she meets an impoverished young Italian who pretends to be a prince.

Partial cast
 Lilian Harvey as Annie Wagner detta 'Mimì' 
 Vittorio De Sica as Riccardo Pietramola 
 Otto Treßler as Forster 
 Hilde von Stolz as La cantante 
 Fritz Odemar as Walter 
 Carla Sveva as La guardarobiera 
 Umberto Sacripante as Il gondoliere

References

Bibliography 
 Moliterno, Gino. The A to Z of Italian Cinema. Scarecrow Press, 2009.

External links 
 

1939 films
Italian comedy films
Italian black-and-white films
1939 comedy films
1930s Italian-language films
Films directed by Augusto Genina
Films set in Vienna
Films set in Italy
Films based on Austrian novels
Italian multilingual films
Films shot at Cinecittà Studios
UFA GmbH films
1939 multilingual films
Films scored by Alessandro Cicognini
1930s Italian films